The Frogs is the debut album by The Frogs. It was originally released in limited quantities (only 1010 copies on black vinyl), and was re-released on CD by Moikai Records in 1999. The album was recorded on 8-Track at Pearl Studios in Milwaukee, Wisconsin and it took a long time to record because of the engineer's limited availability. After this album, The Frogs would release recordings made at home. This debut album gave listeners only a mere taste of the demented humor that was to follow on their second album. In 2022, an "addition" version was released onto streaming services.

Track listing
"And So You're the King"
"C-R-Y"
"Layin' Down My Love 4 U"
"Ocean Tide"
"She Was a  Mortal"
"I'm a Jesus Child"
"What the Trouble Was"
"Funhouse"
"Buried Me Alive"
"Smile"
"Persian Cat"
"F'd Over Jesus"
"Hades High School"
"Don't B Afraid"
"I Can't Remember"
"Whether U Like It or Not I Love U"

"Addition" version 

 "F'd Over Jesus (In Strum Mental)
 "Hades High School (Scream)"
 "Trap"
 "She Was A Mortal (Immortal Mix)"
 "Ocean Tide (In Strum Mental)"
 "C-R-Y (Demo)
 "Why Did It Have 2 Rain?"
 "Smile (Aaron's Calling!)"
 "What the Trouble Was with Your Mind"
 "Layin' Down My Love 4 U (In Strum Mental)
 "Buried Me Alive (Demo)"
 "Therapist"
 "And so You're the King (3 Guitars)"
 "F'd over Jesus #2"
 "Don't B Afraid (Demo)"
 "Funhouse #2"
 "I Can't Remember (Irish Grandpa)"
 "Ocean Tide (Top Hat Mix)"
 "I'm a Jesus Child (Joy Ride Mix)"
 "Purrsion Cat"
 "Whether U Like It or Not I Love U (Demo)"
 "I Can't Remember (In Strum Mental)"

Personnel
 Jimmy Flemion - Guitar, Bass, Lead Vocals
 Dennis Flemion - Drums, Keyboards, Backing Vocals, Lead Vocal on "F'd Over Jesus"

References

External links
 Rustyspell.com
 Thefrogsarchive.com 

1988 debut albums
The Frogs (band) albums